Holostemma is a genus of flowering plants in the family Apocynaceae. The genus was first described in 1810. As presently constituted, the genus contains only one known species, Holostemma ada-kodien, native to southern Asia (China, Nepal, Pakistan, India, Sri Lanka, Myanmar, Thailand).

formerly included
 Holostemma chilense, syn of  Cynanchum chilense 
 Holostemma laeve, syn of Vincetoxicum laeve 
 Holostemma pictum, syn of Graphistemma pictum  
 Holostemma sinense, syn of Metaplexis hemsleyana

References

External links

Plants used in Ayurveda
Flora of Asia
Monotypic Apocynaceae genera
Asclepiadoideae